Stephen Paul Breen (born April 26, 1970) is a nationally syndicated cartoonist. He won the Pulitzer Prize for Editorial Cartooning twice, in 1998 and 2009.

Biography
He graduated from Huntington Beach High School in 1988 and attended the University of California, Riverside, where he earned a bachelor's degree in political science. It was at UCR that he started drawing editorial cartoons for his school paper, The Highlander.

In 1991, Breen won the Scripps Howard Charles M. Schulz Award as the top college cartoonist and the John Locher Memorial Award for Outstanding College Editorial Cartoonist. He was influenced by cartoonists such as Jeff MacNelly, Paul Conrad, Pat Oliphant and Don Wright.

Breen was about to become a high school history teacher when the Asbury Park Press offered him a job in the art department in July 1994. He became the full-time editorial cartoonist there in 1996.

Breen's comic strip Grand Avenue, which is syndicated by United Feature Syndicate and appears in more than 150 newspapers across the country, was launched in 1999. In 2005, Breen's colleague Mike Thompson came on board to help write the strip, and in 2009 became official co-creator. In 2014 Thompson took over most writing & art duties; as of 2016 the strip is entirely by Thompson.

In July 2001, Breen returned to his home state to join the staff of The San Diego Union-Tribune. His editorial cartoons are nationally syndicated by Creators Syndicate (which acquired former syndicate Copley News Service in 2008). They regularly appear in The New York Times, USA Today, Newsweek and U.S. News & World Report.

Breen is the author and illustrator of several children's books: Stick, Violet the Pilot, The Secret of Santa's Island, and Woodpecker Wants a Waffle, for which he won the 2017 New Hampshire State Library Ladybug Picture Book Award. Breen also created the cartoon Powerbirds for NBC Universal-owned children's network, Universal Kids, based on his series of children's books.

References

External links
Creators.com
San Diego Union-Tribune
Billy Ireland Cartoon Library & Museum Art Database

1970 births
Living people
University of California, Riverside alumni
American editorial cartoonists
Pulitzer Prize for Editorial Cartooning winners
Asbury Park Press people
The San Diego Union-Tribune people
American illustrators